Cylicasta liturata is a species of beetle in the family Cerambycidae. It was described by Johan Christian Fabricius in 1801. It is known from Brazil and French Guiana.

References

Onciderini
Beetles described in 1801